The Tu'i Pulotu is believed to be the head of an ancient group of people that settled in Pulotu  (Fiji) during the Lapita period (3500 BC to 2500 BC.). It was said that the Tui Pulotu originally came from the Fiji Islands and led the Pacific Islands from the early BC era to the first 800 years AD. Many people tried to associate Pulotu with Burotukula because of the different pronunciations within Tonga, Samoa and Fiji. And many people knows that Burotu in Fiji was the Burotukula (Spiritual island) which used to be seen near Matuku in Lau,but has no evidence of civilization on its seafloor.

However, that Burotu in Lau no longer exist physically within the first 800 yrs AD when the Tui Pulotu Empire was at its height of supremacy.Or the history of how Matuku was settled,their verbal history said that they came from Davetalevu Tailevu north region, Waimaro,Viti Levu area.As theres no historical account of their early settlers cross over from Burotukula Dreamland to Matuku island.Just that Makadru chiefs encountered with the half man half half p*g from Burotukula.Yes the mana was there of female births in the yavusa Daku after they done their traditional meke practices about Burotukula within Makadru village.But there's a chiefly subclan in the Daku tribe of Makadru called Nakoro with a surname known as Uluibau within the Burotu clan.Those names like Nakoro,Daku,Uluibau,Namena,Namara, Delaiverata,Veinuqa nd Burotu existing in Makadru all sounds familiar nd relates to Davetalevu, the central east region we'll come to know below this information.Even the Tuvana e Colo nd Tuvana e ra of Ono I Lau who used to have a lamentation verse about Burotu are known as Davetalevu people.Same goes to the Burotu land on Kabara,whose people were descended from Daunisai, a son of Lutunasobasoba,son of Tura (former Tui Davetalevu)..We can see that Burotu nearest connection to the yasayasa Moala people were to the Davetalevuans.That was to the Tui Daku of Makadru nd Kubunavanua son of Tura(former Tui Davetalevu before he fled the cannibalism practiced there, to Bua).

 According to Fiji's mythology,the heart of Bulu was the land of the first paradise called Burotu,nd Bulus outer cordon was Murimuria (place of bad souls).And the owner or creator of Bulu was Ratu Mai Bula who lives in Lagi.Thats why our forefathers named Bulu as Vunilagi.Which is the same seafield we know as Vuniivilevu or Davetalevu near Moturiki.

An article on a Fiji newspaper even mentioned Koya Na Sau as the owner of the temple/Savalevu or Burekalou of Korolevu in Burotu.He was believed to be the father of Fijians,Tongans n Samoan chiefs n kings.Koya Na Sau also known as Ratu Levu or Lewanavanua 1 was the eldest son of the Fijian nd Pacific Islanders progenitor Tui Waicalanavanua l(Lutudra/Catanatamani l or QioVula) of Davetalevu Moturiki,the owner of Navukamai(flew back in)abode..No wonder why the Samoans and Tongans knows that when their kings/Chiefs die, their souls will travel back to Pulotu.Because Burotu nd Murimuria both located side by side in Bulu,which is Vunilagi/ Vuniivilevu or Davetalevu near Moturiki.The seafield was also known as Vanuakula /Vanuayalewa or Cakaukoula.

The Mo-tu-riki region also provided names like Delainawaqaibonu means on top of a serpent boat, Nakorovatu (stone village), Korobaba means village built with structured fences, Vatulavelavesa (lifted sacred stones), Vatuwaqa Lailai n Vatuwaqa Levu /Waqavatu (boat loaded with stones big n small).., ancient petroglyphed stone encrypted with concentric circles evidences nd archaeological finds to answer the mysterious transportation of magnetic stones from Uluibau-Daku reef(Mo-tu-riki) to Pohnpei reef Micronesia. That is known nowadays as Nan Madol.So the two gigantic brothers Olisifa nd Olosofa, 17 men nd women nd Fiti Pul the serpent or flying dragon(with strapped stones on her back)transported those magnetic stones  from that Davetalevu Moturiki region to Pohnpei reef Micronesia.As there are pictures of Nan Madol taken by drone from air in the Pohnpeian region which gives the shape of a Bure or Fijian thatched house,nd there is still a big stone on that Uluibau reef called Bure-i nd another stone lay beside Nasautabu further east called Bure which resembles the Bure aerial image of Nan Madol.Plus the highest number of ancient potteries found in the whole Pacific Islands were found on dry land Uluibau nd their reef of South East(Uluibau), Moturiki.Completely summarised the fact that the Seun Nan Leng(reef of heaven)or Nan Madol Ocean city was the extension of that Burotu Empire from Moturiki,Fiji.As there is a link about the Unknown civilization of Nan Madol Pohnpei Micronesia, which talks about the  extreme western region of esoteric attributed to the island of Fiji,just to stamp those facts.

If we see the meaning of the word Pulotu in its breakdown form, "pulo" in Austronesian language means "island" or "to land" and "tu" means "sacred" or "high rank". Same meaning in the Polynesian region goes for the word Motu which means island or to land, and riki means a word of respect for the Fijian westerners used to address kings, chiefs (momo) or people with high rank. Also the word Ariki in the Polynesian region meaning chief or king.

So Motuariki in Polynesia would possibly means the island of chiefs or kings. So,it would make sense,that the Tui Pulotu was originally came from Moturiki. If we look around the Fiji islands during the BC Lapita era, as the first paragraph said. The only island which can match the meaning of the word Pulotu, and where most archaeological discoveries for the so called Lapita civilisations, with the reconstructed woman's face, plus the 6500yrs petroglyphed stone encrypted with concentric circles were found, was in Moturiki, Lomaiviti. There are also numerous small islands in the Pacific, named Motu. And a clear breakdown of the name Moturiki is in Tuamotu group of Islands. According to the Polynesian dictionary, a part of Tuamotus underworld is called Turikiriki. Again in Mamanuca, Malolo Fiji, they breakdown the word Moturiki by these names. Ra koi Motu, ra koi riki, Monuriki, Modriki, Tokoriki, and names which have links to Moturiki like Navadra and Vanuayalewa (female land-facts about Burotu in Lau). However Vanuayalewa is also known for the seafield outside Verata to the east which is Vuniivilevu or Davetalevu itself. 

The island of Pulotu is an island located in Fiji, north-west of Tongatapu. It is referred to in Tongan oral traditions as "the motherland" or "place of origin". It is there that some believed that Tongan culture and its people developed and evolved out of the ancient Austronesian/Lapita culture (c. 1600 BCE - c. 500 BCE) that migrated from the South East Asian islands through Taiwan, the Philippines, Malaysia, Indonesia, Papua New Guinea, Solomon Islands, New Caledonia, Vanuatu, Micronesia and Fiji about 8000 BC.

References

Polynesian mythology
Origin myths